Top-seeded Anne Smith and Paula Smith won the title and $9,600 first-prize money after defeating Virginia Ruzici and Renáta Tomanová in the final.

Seeds
A champion seed is indicated in bold text while text in italics indicates the round in which that seed was eliminated.

 Anne Smith /  Paula Smith (champions)
 Laura duPont /  JoAnne Russell (semifinals)
 Virginia Ruzici /  Renáta Tomanová (final)
 Lele Forood /  Candy Reynolds (quarterfinals)

Draw

Finals

Top half

Bottom half

References

External links

U.S. Clay Court Championships
1980 U.S. Clay Court Championships